The 1998 FIFA World Cup knockout stage covers the games from the second round through to the final at the 1998 FIFA World Cup in France. The top two teams from each of the eight groups qualified for the knockout stage. Teams played one game against each other, with the possibility of extra time and penalties if a winner could not be determined after 90 minutes.

Qualified teams
The top two placed teams from each of the eight groups qualified for the knockout stage.

Bracket
The first games were played on 27 June 1998 and the final took place on 12 July 1998 in Paris.

Round of 16

Italy vs Norway

Vieri scored his fifth goal of the finals and the only one of the game in the 18th minute with exquisite precision, bursting on to Di Biagio's pass 40 yards from goal. Norway had their moments but failed to finish as Pagliuca made some brilliant saves.

Brazil vs Chile

France vs Paraguay

Nigeria vs Denmark

Germany vs Mexico

Netherlands vs FR Yugoslavia
Just three minutes after Slobodan Komljenović scored the equalizer, Predrag Mijatović missed a penalty kick as, after deciding not to hit it to the sides due to Edwin van der Sar's reach, the ball hit the crossbar, prompting him to describe it as the worst moment in his career. Edgar Davids scored the winning goal for the Netherlands in overtime; Davids, suffering a cramp, had asked to be substituted moments before but Guus Hiddink asked him to stay in the field. An apparent scuffle between Van der Sar and Winston Bogarde in the celebration was explained by Van der Sar as an instinctive overreaction from being unintentionally choked by Pierre van Hooijdonk.

Romania vs Croatia
Croatia's winning penalty goal had to be repeated. Šuker scored both times to extend Croatia's debut World Cup run to the quarter-finals.

Argentina vs England

Argentina decided to use their change kit, feeling that it had granted them luck in the 1986 World Cup quarter-final between the two sides. All four goals were scored in the first half, making it the first match in the tournament with as many goals scored before half-time. With the score tied at 2–2, David Beckham retaliated after being fouled by Diego Simeone and was sent off. Beckham's teammate Michael Owen subsequently described Beckham's act as "childish and unnecessary", although Owen also said that the burnings of effigies of Beckham were undeserved. In the subsequent penalty shoot-out, Argentina went first. David Seaman saved Argentina's second penalty from Hernán Crespo to give England the advantage, but that was immediately cancelled when Carlos Roa saved from Paul Ince. The tie ended with another Roa save, from David Batty. Batty said it was the first penalty he had ever taken. England had also exited on penalties in the recent UEFA Euro 1996.

Quarter-finals

Italy vs France

Brazil vs Denmark

Netherlands vs Argentina

Germany vs Croatia

Semi-finals

Brazil vs Netherlands

France vs Croatia

Third place play-off
As both were European teams, this was already set pre-match as the fifth consecutive World Cup in which European teams finished third, stretching back to 1982.

Final

References

1998 FIFA World Cup
1998
Mexico at the 1998 FIFA World Cup
Netherlands at the 1998 FIFA World Cup
France at the 1998 FIFA World Cup
Croatia at the 1998 FIFA World Cup
Brazil at the 1998 FIFA World Cup
Argentina at the 1998 FIFA World Cup
Italy at the 1998 FIFA World Cup
Denmark at the 1998 FIFA World Cup
England at the 1998 FIFA World Cup
Nigeria at the 1998 FIFA World Cup
Germany at the 1998 FIFA World Cup
Paraguay at the 1998 FIFA World Cup
Chile at the 1998 FIFA World Cup
Norway at the 1998 FIFA World Cup
Serbia and Montenegro at the 1998 FIFA World Cup
FIFA World Cup 1998